A collective action clause (CAC) allows a supermajority of bondholders to agree to a debt restructuring that is legally binding on all holders of the bond, including those who vote against the restructuring. Bondholders generally opposed such clauses in the 1980s and 1990s, fearing that it gave debtors too much power. However, following Argentina's December 2001 default on its debts in which its bonds lost 70% of their value, CACs have become much more common, as they are now seen as potentially warding off more drastic action, but enabling easier coordination of bondholders.

During the financial crisis of 2011–12, the Greek government imposed, with the support of the IMF and ECB, a retroactive CAC with a threshold of 75%. That impacted 90% of the bonds, which issued under the jurisdiction of Greek courts. On 9 May 2012, the required supermajority was obtained, with 85.8% of domestic-law bonds tendered in favour. An investor named Bill Gross said, "The sanctity of their contracts is certainly lessened. Bondholders have that to look forward to going into the future," but the French Minister of Finance celebrated the deal. In the exchange, investors will receive new bonds with a face value of 31.5 percent of the old ones, together with notes from the EFSF. The new debt is governed by English law and comes with warrants that may provide extra income in years if Greek economic growth exceeds thresholds. 

In accordance with the treaty establishing the European Stability Mechanism, all bonds issued by Eurozone member states with maturities exceeding one year, issued after January 1, 2013, have a mandatory collective action clause.

References

External links
 Haldane, Andrew G,  Penalver, Adrian,  Saporta, Victoria,  Shin, Hyun Song (2005), "Optimal collective action clause thresholds", Bank of England Quarterly Bulletin, Spring 2005
 Martin Gunkel Oktober 2006, ''Bewältigung von Staatsinsolvenz durch collective action clauses?, Diplomica GmbH, Hamburg, Zugl.: Berlin, Techn. Univ., Diplomarbeit, 2006. (It is a summary about the discussion of cac as instrument to solving state insolvency and include a rich literature review)

Commercial bonds